Restoration is the act of restoring something to its original state and may refer to:
 Conservation and restoration of cultural heritage
 Audio restoration
 Film restoration
 Image restoration
 Textile restoration
Restoration ecology
Environmental restoration

Film and television
 The Restoration (1909 film), a film by D.W. Griffith starring Mary Pickford
 The Restoration (1910 film), an American silent short drama produced by the Thanhouser Company
 The Restoration (2020 film), a Peruvian comedy film
 Restoration (1995 film), a film by Michael Hoffman starring Robert Downey Jr
 Restoration (2011 film), an Israeli film by Yossi Madmoni
 Restoration (2016 film), an Australian science fiction thriller by Stuart Willis
 Restoration (TV series), a BBC TV series
 "Restoration" (Arrow), an episode of Arrow

History 
 Kenmu Restoration (1333) in Japan
 Portuguese Restoration War (1640–1668)
 Stuart Restoration (1660) in England, Wales and associated realms
 Restoration (Ireland)
 Restoration (Scotland)
 Restoration in the English colonies
 Restoration and Regeneration in Switzerland (1814–1830)
 First Restoration in France (1814)
 Bourbon Restoration in France (1815)
 Restoration (Peru) (1839–1841), also called the Peruvian Restoration
 Dominican Restoration War (1863–1865)
 Meiji Restoration (1868) in Japan
 Restoration (Spain) (1874–1931), also called the Bourbon Restoration
 Manchu Restoration (1917) in China

Literature
 Restoration comedy, English comedy written and performed in the English Restoration period of 1660–1710
 Restoration (Berg novel), a 2002 novel by Carol Berg
 Restoration (Ólafsson novel), a 2012 novel by Ólafur Jóhann Ólafsson
 Restoration (Tremain novel), a 1989 novel by Rose Tremain set during the English Revolution
 Restoration (newspaper), a Catholic newspaper published by the Madonna House Apostolate

Music
 Restorations (band), an American rock band
 Restoration (EP), an EP by Haken
 Restoration (Lecrae album)
 Restoration, half of the Revamp & Restoration double tribute album to Elton John and Bernie Taupin

Religion 
 Church of God (Restoration), denomination rooted in the holiness movement
 Restoration (Latter Day Saints), doctrine of the Latter Day Saint movement
 Restoration branches, independent Latter Day Saints organizations
 Restoration Movement, a Christian movement originating in the 19th century that seeks to restore the doctrine and practice of the early church

Ships
 HMS Restoration (1678), a third rate built by Betts
 HMS Restoration (1706), a third rate

Other uses
 Dental restoration
 Restoration Hardware, a hardware store
 Restoration style

See also 
 Restauration (disambiguation)
 Restorationism (disambiguation)
 Concert of Europe, the European Restoration following the Napoleonic Wars
 Foreskin restoration, the process of regaining some of the tissue lost in circumcision
 Reforestation, natural or intentional restocking of existing forests and woodlands that have been depleted, usually through deforestation
 Restoration of the Monarchy, a fashion label by Eric Villency
 Restorative justice, in criminal justice sometimes called restoration
 Restore (disambiguation)
 Restored train